The Headquarters of the Federal Intelligence Service or the BND Headquarters (colloquially the ) is the headquarters of the Federal Intelligence Service (BND) of Germany, and is located at the Chausseestraße in the Mitte district in the centre of Berlin. It is also known colloquially by the metonym Chausseestraße. Established during the early Cold War, the Federal Intelligence Service is the second largest intelligence agency in the Western world, second only to its close partner, the Central Intelligence Agency (CIA) of the United States. The building that houses its headquarters is the world's largest intelligence building, somewhat larger than the CIA headquarters at Langley.

History
The complex is designed by the architect firm Kleihues + Kleihues. Construction started in 2006 and was completed in 2017. With 260,000 m2 (2.8 million ft²), it is the world's largest intelligence headquarters, somewhat bigger than the CIA headquarters at Langley, and around 4,000 people work there. It is also Berlin's second largest building, after Berlin Tempelhof Airport. The first employees moved into the new complex in late 2017; the relocation from the former headquarters in Pullach was completed in the autumn of 2018.

The headquarters is located near the former trace of the Berlin Wall, on the eastern side, some 350 meters (1150 ft) from the canal which marked the border to West Berlin during the Cold War, and directly adjacent to the former Chausseestraße crossing point. The headquarters are built on the site of the former stadium Stadion der Weltjugend.

Following the decision to build the new BND headquarters there, a massive urban renewal has taken place in the neighbourhood, with many new construction projects opposite the BND headquarters, including high-end apartment buildings, a new park, the Café Top Secret, a new hotel, and buildings housing office spaces and retail stores.

The headquarters includes a visitor center that is open to the public; it is the first intelligence organisation to have such a center.

Although completed in 2017, the official opening was held in February 2019. Angela Merkel, Chancellor of Germany attended and made this statement: "In an often very confusing world, now, more urgently than ever, Germany needs a strong and efficient foreign intelligence service". At the time, some 4,000 employees were expected to work from this location, moving here from the former headquarters in a suburb of Munich. The agency's total number of employees, in Germany and other countries, was approximately 6,500.

References

Buildings and structures in Mitte
Intelligence agency headquarters
Government buildings completed in 2017
2017 establishments in Germany
Federal Intelligence Service